Brent Crude may refer to any or all of the components of the Brent Complex, a physically and financially traded oil market based around the North Sea of Northwest Europe; colloquially, Brent Crude usually refers to the price of the ICE (Intercontinental Exchange) Brent Crude Oil futures contract or the contract itself. The original Brent Crude referred to a trading classification of sweet light crude oil first extracted from the Brent oilfield in the North Sea in 1976. As production from the Brent oilfield declined to zero in 2021, crude oil blends from other oil fields have been added to the trade classification. The current Brent blend consists of crude oil produced from the Forties (added 2002), Oseberg (added 2002), Ekofisk (added 2007), and Troll (added 2018) oil fields (also known as the BFOET Quotation).

The Brent Crude oil marker is also known as Brent Blend, London Brent and Brent petroleum. This grade is described as light because of its relatively low density, and sweet because of its low sulphur content.

Brent is the leading global price benchmark for Atlantic basin crude oils. It is used to set the price of two-thirds of the world's internationally traded crude oil supplies. It is one of the two main benchmark prices for purchases of oil worldwide, the other being West Texas Intermediate (WTI).

Brent Complex
Popular media references to "Brent crude" usually refers to the ICE Brent crude oil futures price. The ICE Brent crude oil futures price is part of the Brent Complex, a physical and financial market for crude oil based around the North Sea of Northwest Europe, which could include numerous elements that can be referred to as Brent crude:
 Brent crude oil monthly futures contracts
 Brent crude oil monthly forward contracts
 Brent crude oil weekly Contract-for-Difference (CFD)
 Dated Brent short-term assessed prices
 Brent-Forties-Oseberg-Ekofisk-Troll (BFOET), Dated Brent, or Brent spot market
 Brent oilfield crude oil blend
 ICE Brent Index
The Brent Complex fosters commercial transactions of Brent crude oil, gathers price data those transactions (in forwards, CFDs, and Dated Brent), establishes reference prices for other global oil trade transactions (in Dated Brent assessed prices, Dated BFOET assessed prices, forward traded prices, and futures traded prices), and transfers risks of those transactions (through hedging in forward and futures markets).

Brent crude oil futures contracts

ICE Brent crude oil futures
The ICE Futures Europe symbol for Brent crude oil futures is B.  It was originally traded on the open outcry International Petroleum Exchange in London starting in 1988, but since 2005 has been traded on the electronic Intercontinental Exchange, known as ICE.  One contract equals  and quoted in U.S. dollars. Up to 96 contracts, for 96 consecutive months, in the Brent crude oil futures contract series are available for trading. For example, before the last trading date for May 2020, 96 contracts, from contracts for May 2020, June 2020, July 2020 ... Mar 2028, April 2028, and May 2028 are available for trading. ICE Clear Europe acts as the central counterparty for Brent crude oil and related contracts. Brent contracts are deliverable contracts based on 'Exchange of Futures for Physicals' (EFP) delivery with an option to cash settle against the ICE Brent Index price for the last trading day of the futures contract.

CME Brent crude oil futures
In addition to ICE, two types of Brent crude financial futures are also traded on the NYMEX (now part of the Chicago Mercantile Exchange (CME). They are ultimately priced in relation to the ICE Brent crude oil futures and the ICE Brent Index.

Brent Crude Oil Penultimate Financial Futures, also known as Brent Crude Oil Futures, are traded using the symbol BB, and are cash settled based on the ICE Brent Crude Oil Futures 1st nearby contract settlement price on the penultimate trading day for the delivery month.

Brent Last Day Financial Futures, also known as Brent Crude Oil Financial Futures, are traded using the symbol BZ, and are cash settled based on the ICE Brent Crude Oil Index price as published one day after the final trading day for the delivery month.

Role in hedging
Although price discovery for the Brent Complex is driven in the Brent forward market, many hedgers and traders prefer to use futures contracts like the ICE Brent futures contract to avoid the risk of large physical deliveries. If the market participant is using Brent futures to hedge physical oil transactions based on Dated Brent, they will still face basis risk between Dated Brent and EFP prices. Hedgers could use a Crude Diff or 'Dated to Front Line' (DFL) contract, which is a spread contract between Dated Brent and Brent 1st Line Future (the front month future), to hedge the basis risk. So a complete hedge would be the relevant Brent futures contract, and a DFL contract when the futures contract becomes the front month future. This is equivalent to a Brent forward contract and a CFD contract in forward contract terms.

Price difference with WTI

Historically, price differences between Brent and other index crudes have been based on physical differences in crude oil specifications and short-term variations in supply and demand. Prior to September 2010, there existed a typical price difference per barrel of between ±3 USD/bbl compared to WTI and OPEC Basket; however, since the autumn of 2010 Brent has been priced much higher than WTI, reaching a difference of more than $11 a barrel by the end of February 2011 (WTI: 104 USD/bbl, LCO: 116 USD/bbl). In February 2011 the divergence reached $16 during a supply glut, record stockpiles, at Cushing, Oklahoma before peaking at above $23 in August 2012. It has since (September 2012) decreased significantly to around $18 after refinery maintenance settled down and supply issues eased slightly.

Many reasons have been given for this divergence ranging from regional demand variations, to the depletion of the North Sea oil fields.

The US Energy Information Administration attributes the price spread between WTI and Brent to an oversupply of crude oil in the interior of North America (WTI price is set at Cushing, Oklahoma) caused by rapidly increasing oil production from unconventional reservoirs such as Canadian oil sands and tight oil formations such as the Bakken Formation, Niobrara Formation, and Eagle Ford Formation. Oil production in the interior of North America has exceeded the capacity of pipelines to carry it to markets on the Gulf Coast and east coast of North America; as a result, the oil price on the US and Canadian east coast and parts of the US Gulf Coast since 2011 has been set by the price of Brent Crude, while markets in the interior still follow the WTI price. Much US and Canadian crude oil from the interior is now shipped to the coast by railroad, which is much more expensive than pipeline.

April 2020 WTI negative pricing and Brent vulnerability
On April 20, 2020 the CME WTI futures contract for May 2020 settled at −US$37.63 a barrel due to oil demand shocks from the COVID-19 pandemic, and to dwindling storage capacity at the futures contract delivery point at Cushing, Oklahoma. Brent settled for US$26.21 at the same time, for a difference of $63.84. While the oil demand shock and limited storage capacity affects both WTI and Brent futures contracts, Brent contracts have greater access to storage, and greater buffers to absorb demand shocks than the WTI contracts. Brent futures contracts could theoretically access the storage capacity of all the shore tanks in North West Europe and of available shipping storage, while CME WTI contracts are restricted to storage and pipeline capacity at Cushing only. Brent futures contracts are traded in relation with Dated Brent and other contracts in the Brent Complex, allowing other contracts in the system to absorb demand shocks. Up to April 20, most of the demand shock from the COVID-19 pandemic has been absorbed by Dated Brent contracts and Dated Brent quality differentials, which spared pricing pressure on Brent futures contracts. While Brent is more insulated to negative pricing by these factors than WTI, negative prices are still possible should oil demand and storage capacity fall further.

Brent crude oil monthly forward contracts
Brent crude oil monthly forward contracts started trading in 1983 as "open" contracts, or contracts that specify delivery month but not the delivery date. From 1983-1985, these contracts were for 500,000 barrels of Brent Blend crude, and were increased to 600,000 barrels after 1985. Deals were made bilaterally between two parties by telephone and confirmed by telex. Payment for deals were made 30 days after oil delivery. Since deals were bilateral and not centrally cleared like futures transactions, parties to the deal sought financial guarantees such as letters of credit to minimize counterparty credit risk. Contracts for one and two months forward were available in 1983, contracts for three months forward were available in 1984, contracts for four months forward were available in 1985, and contracts for at least four months are available for trading today. Sellers of Brent forward contracts initially had to give buyers a notice of at least 15 days of intention to deliver. More recently, the notice period has expanded to 10 days to one month ahead. This shifted the front month of the Brent forward contract. For example, on May 4, the Front Month forward contract (also known as M1) is the July contract, the Second Month (M2) contract is the August contract, and the Third Month (M3) contract is the September contract.

Producers and refiners buy and sell oil on the market for wholesale trade, hedging, and tax purposes. Producers without integrated refinery operations, and vise versa for refiners without oil production, had to sell oil and could hedge oil price risk with forward contracts. Integrated oil producers (those with refinery operations) had the same motives, but had an extra incentive to lower taxes. Integrated oil producers faced taxes when transferring oil internally from production to refining operations. These taxes are calculated based on a reference price originally set by BNOC and eventually calculated as a 30-day price average of spot prices before an oil transaction. Forward market prices tended to be lower than these reference prices a lot of the times, and integrated oil producers could profitably lower their tax obligations by selling oil on the forward market from their production operations, and buying back oil from unrelated parties for their refining operations on the same market. This practice became less prevalent with the introduction of tougher regulations in 1987.

Speculators became bilateral intermediaries between producers and refiners, and speculative deals came to dominate the forward market. Since there was no central clearing of those forward contracts, speculators who bought Brent forwards at the time and who do not want to take delivery of physical oil must find other parties to take the oil, and long chains of speculators formed between producers and refiners for every cargo of oil traded. Integrated oil producers also blurred the lines between commercial and speculative activity, as they could re-direct physical oil cargoes, and choose which forward contracts to deliver and which contracts to pass on to other speculators or producers.

Front Month Brent forward contracts prices came to be used as reference prices for spot transactions, but became vulnerable to speculative squeezes. The development of a Dated Brent and Forward Month Brent Contracts-for-Difference market increased this vulnerability, and market participants gradually switched to using Dated Brent as the spot transaction reference price by 1988.

Brent crude oil contract-for-difference (CFD)
Brent crude oil contract-for-difference (CFD) is a weekly spread or swap between the Dated Brent assessed price and the Second Month (or M2) Brent crude oil forward contract. They trade over a five day work week in volumes of 100 or 100,000 lots and the most recent CFD rolls to the next-week CFD on Thursday. The CFD market developed in 1988 in response to basis risk between the Brent futures/forward contract prices and the spot/dated Brent prices.

Dated Brent assessed prices and the Brent spot market
In contrast to open forward contracts, Brent crude oil "dated" contracts – known as dated Brent contracts – specifies the delivery date of crude in the current month in the spot market. Spot market transactions are generally not public, so market participants usually analyzed Dated Brent prices using assessments from Price Reporting Agencies (PRAs), who collect private transactions data and aggregate them. The important PRAs for the Brent Complex are Platts, Argus, and ICIS. Platts dominates the assessed Dated Brent price, Argus publishes a BFOET assessed crude price called Argus North Sea Dated crude price, and ICIS provides the final settlement data to the ICE Brent Index (which ultimately settles ICE Brent futures) since 2015.

However, in the early 1990s, Brent and BFOET crude spot markets started to price transactions using assessed Dated Brent prices as benchmark prices, which created a feedback loop that diluted fundamental supply and demand information contained in the assessed Dated Brent price, and created incentives for speculative squeezes.

Platts and other PRAs got around the problem by quoting both a dated Brent assessed on outright spot market transactions, and a "North Sea Date Brent Strip" assessed using a Front Month Brent forward price curve created out of adding the Brent Front Month contract price and relevant weekly Brent contracts-for-difference (CFD) prices. These dated Brent prices became less vulnerable to speculative squeezes, since market actors who try to corner the spot market will find that other market participants can sell on the front month forward market or on prices referenced to a front month forward market price, and market actors who try to monopolize the front month forward market will find that they would lose what they earned in the forward market in the spot market, as price effect they created in the front month contract will pass on to the dated Brent prices.

Platt's compile their assessment prices during price assessment 'windows', or specific times of market trading, usually close to the end of trading for a particular day. Trading in these windows are dominated by group of major market participants, as listed in the table below.

Brent oilfield crude oil blend
Originally Brent Crude was produced from the Brent Oilfield. The name "Brent" comes from the naming policy of Shell UK Exploration and Production, operating on behalf of ExxonMobil and Royal Dutch Shell, which originally named all of its fields after birds (in this case the brent goose). But it is also a backronym or mnemonic for the formation layers of the oil field: Broom, Rannoch, Etive, Ness and Tarbert.

Petroleum production from Europe, Africa, and the Middle East flowing West tends to be priced relative to this oil, i.e. it forms a benchmark. The other well-known classifications (also called references or benchmarks) are the OPEC Reference Basket, Dubai Crude, Oman Crude, Shanghai Crude, Urals oil and West Texas Intermediate (WTI).

Characteristics

Brent blend is a light crude oil (LCO), though not as light as West Texas Intermediate (WTI). It contains approximately 0.37% of sulphur, classifying it as sweet crude, yet not as sweet as WTI.  Brent is suitable for production of petrol and middle distillates.  It is typically refined in Northwest Europe.

Brent Index
The Brent Index is the cash settlement price for the Intercontinental Exchange (ICE) Brent Future based on ICE Futures Brent index at expiry.

The index represents the average price of trading in the 25-day Brent Blend, Forties, Oseberg, Ekofisk (BFOE) market in the relevant delivery month as reported and confirmed by the industry media. Only published cargo size trades and assessments are taken into consideration.

The index is calculated as an average of the following elements:

 A weighted average of first month cargo trades in the 25-day BFOE market.
 A weighted average of second month cargo trades in the 25-day BFOE market plus or minus a straight average of the spread trades between the first and second months.
 A straight average of designated assessments published in media reports.

See also
 List of crude oil products
 Petrobourse
 Petroeuro

References

External links

 Definition
 Crude oil types, US Energy Information Administration, US Department of Energy

Benchmark crude oils
Oil and gas markets